Matucana aurantiaca (common name, orange matucana) is a species of flowering plant in the cactus family Cactaceae. It grows in the Cajamarca and La Libertad regions of Peru. It is considered to have a stable population and a wide range with no threats.

Description 
It bears orange funnel-shaped flowers in summer. The Latin specific epithet aurantiaca means “orange”.

In temperate areas this plant requires some protection from rain and frost, so is best grown under glass in an unheated greenhouse which receives plenty of sun. It is kept dry through the winter, but watered and fed during the growing season, from spring to autumn. In cultivation in the United Kingdom it has been given the Royal Horticultural Society’s Award of Garden Merit.

References

Trichocereeae
Cacti of South America
Endemic flora of Peru
Least concern biota of South America